Ampittia capenas, the riverine ranger or African bush hopper, is a species of butterfly in the family Hesperiidae.

Range and habitat

It is found in Kenya, Tanzania, Malawi, the Democratic Republic of the Congo, Zambia, Mozambique and Zimbabwe. The habitat consists of the banks of streams and rivers.

Habits
Adults are on wing from August to October and from February to April.

Subspecies
Ampittia capenas capenas — eastern Kenya, Tanzania, Malawi, Mozambique, Zimbabwe
Ampittia capenas blanda Evans, 1947 — Democratic Republic of Congo: Shaba, eastern Zambia

References

Butterflies described in 1868
Ampittia
Butterflies of Africa
Taxa named by William Chapman Hewitson